Erich Ebermayer (14 September 1900 – 22 September 1970) was a German writer of plays, novels and articles. He was also a screenwriter involved with around thirty films including the 1937 historical production Madame Bovary.

Selected filmography

 The Green Domino (1935)
 The Dreamer (1936)
 The Hour of Temptation (1936)
 His Daughter is Called Peter (1936)
 Madame Bovary (1937)
 Love Can Lie (1937)
 All Lies (1938)
 The Right to Love (1939)
 We Make Music (1942)
 The Golden Spider (1943)
 The Black Robe (1944)
 Canaris (1954)
 The Immenhof Girls (1955)
 One Woman Is Not Enough? (1955)
 The Blue Moth (1959)

References

External links

Bibliography
 Goble, Alan. The Complete Index to Literary Sources in Film. Walter de Gruyter, 1999.
 Paietta, Ann & Kauppila, Jean. Health Professionals on Screen. Scarecrow Press, 1999.

1900 births
1970 deaths
Officers Crosses of the Order of Merit of the Federal Republic of Germany
German male screenwriters
People from Bamberg
German male writers
Film people from Bavaria
20th-century German screenwriters